Ciumeghiu is a commune in Bihor County, Crișana, Romania with a population of 4,297 people (2011). It is composed of three villages: Boiu (Mezőbaj), Ciumeghiu and Ghiorac (Erdőgyarak).

At the 2011 census, 50.6% of inhabitants were Romanians, 24.6% Hungarians and 24.5% Roma.

See also
Cighid, children's home in Communist and early post-Communist Romania, with extermination camp-like conditions, located in Ghiorac

References

Ciumeghiu
Localities in Crișana